Charles Pinckney (October 26, 1757October 29, 1824) was an American Founding Father, planter, and politician who was a signer of the United States Constitution. He was elected and served as the 37th governor of South Carolina, later serving two more non-consecutive terms. He also served as a U.S. Senator and a member of the House of Representatives. He was first cousin once removed of fellow signer Charles Cotesworth Pinckney.

Pinckney's descendants included seven future South Carolina governors, including men related to the Maybank and Rhett families.

Early life and education

Pinckney was born and educated in Charles Town in the Province of South Carolina. His father, Colonel Charles Pinckney, was a rich lawyer and planter. His mother was Frances Brewton (b. 1733), daughter of a goldsmith and sister of Miles Brewton and Rebecca Brewton Motte, who were both also prominent in Charleston history.

His father had signed a loyalty oath to the British after they occupied Charleston in 1780 during the American Revolutionary War. This enabled him to keep his property. On his death in 1782, the senior Pinckney bequeathed Snee Farm, a plantation outside the city, and his numerous slaves, to his eldest son Charles.

Marriage and family
Busy with the war and his political career, Pinckney did not marry until 1788. He married Mary Eleanor Laurens on April 27, 1788, at Saint Philip's Church in Charleston. Mary was the daughter of Henry Laurens, a wealthy and politically powerful South Carolina slave trader. They had at least three children.

Among his in-laws were father-in-law Henry Laurens, Colonel John Laurens and U.S. Representative David Ramsay. A brother-in-law married the daughter of South Carolina Governor John Rutledge.

Career
He was elected as a delegate to the Third Continental Congress (1777–78).  He started to practice law in Charleston in 1779 at age 21. About that time, well after the War for Independence had begun, Pinckney enlisted in the militia. He became a lieutenant and served at the siege of Savannah. When Charleston fell to the British the next year, Pinckney was captured; he was held as a prisoner until June 1781 and sent north for a potential exchange. He did not return to Charleston until 1783. His father was also captured. Along with more than 160 men, Colonel Pinckney agreed to sign an oath of allegiance to the British, in order to avoid having his property confiscated and destroyed. After the war, Pinckney was fined 12% on his property for having sworn a Loyalist allegiance.

Pinckney was elected again to the Continental Congress following the war, serving 1784–1787.  He was elected to the state legislature for several terms (1779–1780, 1786–1789, and 1792–1796). As a nationalist, he worked in Congress trying to ensure that the United States would receive navigation rights from Spain to the Mississippi River and to strengthen congressional power.

Pinckney eventually owned several plantations and a townhouse in Charleston in addition to Snee Farm: Frankville and Hopton, situated on both sides of the Congaree River, near Columbia; a plantation in Georgetown consisting of 560 acres of tidal swamp and 600 acres of high land; a tract of 1,200 acres called Lynches Creek; Fee Farm on the Ashepoo River; Shell Hall, a house with four acres of land at Haddrell's Point in Christ Church Parish; a house and garden lot on Meeting Street, Charleston; Wright's Savannah plantation on the Carolina side of the Savannah River; and a tract of land on the Santee River above the canal, including a ferry, called Mount Tacitus. After Pinckney married Eleanor Laurens in 1788, the elegant three-story brick home at 16 Meeting Street in Charleston presumably became his principal residence. In the 1790 federal census, he is recorded as holding "14 slaves in St. Philip's and St. Michael's Parish, 52 slaves in St. Bartholomew, and 45 slaves in the Orangeburg District," all in addition to Snee Farm, where his father's probate record had listed 40 slaves in 1787.

Pinckney's role in the Constitutional Convention is controversial. Although one of the youngest delegates, he later claimed to have been the most influential one and contended he had submitted a draft, known as the Pinckney Plan, that was the basis of the final Constitution. This was strongly disputed by James Madison and some of the other framers. Pinckney submitted an elaborate form of the Virginia Plan, proposed first by Edmund Randolph, but it was disregarded by the other delegates. Historians assess him as an important contributing delegate. Pinckney boasted that he was 24, allowing him to claim distinction as the youngest delegate, but he was 29 years old at the time of the convention. He attended full-time, spoke often and effectively, and contributed to the final draft and to resolution of problems that arose during the debates. He also worked for ratification of the Constitution in South Carolina (1788).

At the Convention, Pierce Butler and Pinckney, both from South Carolina, introduced the Fugitive Slave Clause (Article IV, Section II, Clause III). James Wilson of Pennsylvania objected, saying that it was special protection for slaveholders, requiring all state governments to enforce it at taxpayers' expense, in places where no one or most residents did not own slaves. Butler withdrew the clause, but the next day a southerner reinstated the clause and the Convention adopted it without further objection. This clause was added to the clause that provided extradition for fugitives from justice.

This clause was first applied to fugitive slaves and required that they be extradited upon the claims of their masters. Despite the clause, free states sometimes declined to enforce it. The Fugitive Slave Act of 1850 increased requirements on the states and penalties for failure to assist in the return of slaves. This practice was not eliminated until the Thirteenth Amendment abolished the institution of slavery. In 1864, during the Civil War, an effort to repeal this clause of the Constitution had failed.

Pinckney introduced a clause into the Constitution in opposition to an established state religion. His No Religious Test Clause read as follows:

Once the inclusion of the phrase was brought to a vote, it passed with little opposition. For the first time, an official of a national government was not required to have a religion. Pinckney is also responsible for the inclusion of the writ of habeas corpus into the Constitution. Initially introduced as "Nor shall the privilege of the Writ of Habeas Corpus ever be suspended, except in case of rebellion or invasion", it is now a part of Article 1 of the United States Constitution.

Pinckney's political career blossomed. From 1789 to 1792, the state legislature elected him as governor of South Carolina, and in 1790 he chaired the state constitutional convention. During this period, he became associated with the Federalist Party, in which he and his cousin Charles Cotesworth Pinckney were leaders. But, with the passage of time, the former's views began to change. In 1795 he attacked the Federalist-backed Jay Treaty. He increasingly began to cast his lot with Carolina back-country Democratic-Republicans against his own eastern elite. The population in the western part of the state was increasing, but legislative apportionment favored the Low Country planters. In 1796 Pinckney was elected governor again by the state legislature. In 1798 his Democratic-Republican supporters in the legislature elected him to the U.S. Senate.

He strongly opposed actions by his former party. In the presidential election of 1800, he served as Thomas Jefferson's campaign manager in South Carolina. The victorious Jefferson appointed Pinckney as minister to Spain (1801–05).  He tried but did not succeed in gaining cession Spanish Florida to the United States. He facilitated Spanish acquiescence in the transfer of Louisiana from France to the United States in 1803 by the Louisiana Purchase. (Spain had already returned rule of this territory to France under Napoleon.)

Pinckney returned from Spain to Charleston and to leadership of the state Democratic-Republican Party. He served in the legislature in 1805–06 and was elected again as governor (1806–08). In this position, he favored legislative reapportionment in order to give more fair representation to back-country districts. He also advocated universal white manhood suffrage. He served again in the legislature from 1810 to 1814 and then temporarily withdrew from politics. In 1818 he won election to the U.S. House of Representatives where he fought against the Missouri Compromise. A major slaveholder whose wealth depended on enslaved labor at his plantations, he supported expansion of the institution of slavery to new territories and states.

In 1821, with his health beginning to fail, Pinckney retired for the last time from politics. He died in 1824. A memorial was erected in St. Michael's Church in Charleston, South Carolina. The memorial was sculpted by Solomon Gibson (younger brother of John Gibson) in Liverpool in Great Britain.

Legacy and honors
Pinckney's Snee Farm plantation is maintained as Charles Pinckney National Historic Site. His son, Henry L. Pinckney was a U.S. Representative from South Carolina, and mayor of Charleston. His daughter married Robert Young Hayne, who became a U.S. Representative, mayor of Charleston, and governor of South Carolina. Pinckney was a Freemason and a member of Solomon’s Lodge No. 1 in Charleston.

See also
 U.S. Constitution, slavery debate in Convention
 Independent state legislature theory: constitutional legal theory ascribed to Pinckney.

References
 
 Marty D. Mathews, Forgotten Founder: The Life and Times of Charles Pinckney (Columbia: University of South Carolina Press, 2004).

External links

 SCIway Biography of Charles Pinckney
 NGA Biography of Charles Pinckney
 The Plan of Charles Pinckney – Submitted as an alternative to the Virginia Plan

1757 births
1824 deaths
Signers of the United States Constitution
Governors of South Carolina
University of South Carolina trustees
United States senators from South Carolina
Ambassadors of the United States to Spain
Pinckney family
American proslavery activists
American people of English descent
Continental Congressmen from South Carolina
18th-century American politicians
19th-century American politicians
South Carolina militiamen in the American Revolution
American Revolutionary War prisoners of war held by Great Britain
South Carolina Federalists
Democratic-Republican Party United States senators
Members of the Middle Temple
19th-century American diplomats
Democratic-Republican Party members of the United States House of Representatives from South Carolina
Federalist Party state governors of the United States
Democratic-Republican Party state governors of the United States
American slave owners
American white supremacists
United States senators who owned slaves
Founding Fathers of the United States